Every Good Boy Deserves Favour is the seventh album by The Moody Blues, released in 1971.

Background
This album featured the only track to be written by all five members of the band. The opening "Procession" was a piece that was intended to describe the history of music from the beginning of time up until the album's recording.  The only three words heard in this track—"desolation," "creation," and "communication"—were similarly used (along with many other "-ation" words) in "One More Time to Live."

The album reached #1 on the British album charts, in addition to a three-week stay at #2 in the United States, and produced one top-40 single, "The Story in Your Eyes." The track "Emily's Song" was written by John Lodge for his newborn daughter. Mike Pinder wrote and sang the album's concluding track "My Song."

The title is taken from the student mnemonic for the lines of the treble clef: E-G-B-D-F. These notes are heard played on piano during "Procession."

The album was the last to feature the Mellotron as the sole tape-driven instrument, as it would be utilized in conjunction with the Chamberlin (another device that uses recorded tape to generate sound) on the Moody Blues' next studio album, 1972's Seventh Sojourn. The album was mixed and released in both stereo and quadraphonic. In April 2007 the album was remastered into SACD format and repackaged with the two extra tracks.

In 2008 a remaster for standard audio CD was issued with the same bonus tracks.

The cover art created by artist Phil Travers was inspired by the work named Der Kristall (The Crystal) by German artist Sulamith Wülfing. The front cover has been imitated by the leader of the dark progressive band Current 93, David Tibet, for Halo, a live album released in 2004.

Track listing

Personnel

The Moody Blues
 Justin Hayward – vocals, guitars, sitar
 John Lodge – vocals, bass, cello
 Ray Thomas – vocals, flute, tambourine, oboe, woodwinds, harmonica
 Graeme Edge – drums, percussion, electronic drums and vocals on "Procession"
 Mike Pinder – vocals, Mellotron, harpsichord, Hammond organ, piano, celesta, Moog synthesizer

Production
 Tony Clarke – producer
 Derek Varnals – recording engineer
 David Baker – assistant engineer
 Harry Fisher – cutting engineer
 Phil Travers – sleeve artist
 J. Randall Nelson – lyrics sheet photograph

Charts

Certifications

References

1971 albums
The Moody Blues albums
Threshold Records albums
Albums produced by Tony Clarke (record producer)